The Baltic region is home to the largest known deposit of amber, called Baltic amber or succinite. It was produced sometime during the Eocene epoch, but exactly when is controversial. It has been estimated that these forests created more than 100,000 tons of amber. Today, more than 90% of the world's amber comes from Kaliningrad Oblast of Russia. It is a major source of income for the region; the local Kaliningrad Amber Combine extracted 250 tonnes of it in 2014, 400 tonnes in 2015.

"Baltic amber" was formerly thought to include amber from the Bitterfeld brown coal mines in Saxony (Eastern Germany). Bitterfeld amber was previously believed to be only 20–22 million years old (Miocene), but a comparison of the animal inclusions in 2003 suggested that it was possibly Baltic amber that was redeposited in a Miocene deposit. Further study of insect taxa in the ambers has shown Bitterfeld amber to be from the same forest as the Baltic amber forest, but separately deposited from a more southerly section, in a similar manner as Ukrainian Rovno amber. Other sources of Baltic amber have been listed as coming from Poland and Russia.

Because Baltic amber contains from 3 to 8% succinic acid, it is also termed succinite.

Geologic context 

In situ Baltic amber is derived from the sediments of the geological formation termed the Prussian Formation, formerly called the "Amber Formation", with the main amber bearing horizon being referred to as "Blue Earth", so named due to its glauconite content. The formation is exposed in the northern part of the Sambia Peninsula in Kaliningrad. Much of the Baltic amber has been secondarily redeposited in Pleistocene glacial till deposits across the North European Plain. It has been proposed that the amber is secondarily redeposited in coastal lagoonal conditions after a marine transgression of the amber forest. The age of the amber is controversial, though it is generally interpreted as having been produced during the Eocene epoch (56-34 million years ago). Different authors have given estimates of 40-47 million years ago and 35-43 million years ago as the age of the amber.

Baltic amber tree
It is universally agreed that the amber is coniferous in origin. It was thought since the 1850s that the resin that became amber was produced by the tree Pinites succinifer, but research in the 1980s came to the conclusion that the resin originates from several species. More recently, it has been proposed, on the evidence of Fourier-transform infrared microspectroscopy (FTIR) analysis of amber and resin from living trees, that conifers of the family Sciadopityaceae were responsible. The only extant representative of this family is the Japanese umbrella pine, Sciadopitys verticillata.

Structure 

The structure of Baltic amber (succinite) is complex. It is not a polymer, because it is not composed of a repeating pattern of mers of the same type. Rather it has a macromolecular structure arranged in a crosslinked network, in which the pores (free spaces) are filled by components of molecular structure (e.g. by mono- and sesquiterpenes). Thus the chemical structure of the amber may be described as a supramolecule. The structure makes the amber denser, harder and more resistant to external factors. It also makes possible good preservation of plant and animal inclusions.

Paleobiology

Numerous extinct genera and species of plants and animals have been discovered and scientifically described from inclusions in Baltic amber. Inclusions of insects make up over 98% of the animals preserved in the amber, while all other arthropods, annelids, molluscs, nematodes, protozoans contribute less than 0.5% of the animals. Vertebrates are another 0.5% of the animals included and mostly are represented by mammal fur, feathers, and reptiles.

Flora

Fauna

See also
 Amber Coast
 Dominican amber
 Japanese amber
 Ukrainian amber

References

Bibliography 

 
Eocene
Oligocene
Paleontological sites of Europe
Geology of Lithuania